The 1985–86 Northern Counties East Football League season was the 4th in the history of Northern Counties East Football League, a football competition in England.

At the end of the previous season divisions One North, One Central and One South was reorganised. The clubs were distributed between newly formed divisions One, Two and Three.

Division Three was disbanded at the end of the season. Most of the Division Three clubs were promoted to Division Two.

Premier Division

The Premier Division featured 17 clubs which competed in the previous season, along with three new clubs:
Armthorpe Welfare, promoted from Division One Central
Farsley Celtic, promoted from Division One North
Long Eaton United, promoted from Division One South

League table

Division One

At the end of the previous season divisions One North, One South and One Central was reorganised. The clubs were distributed between newly formed divisions One, Two and Three.
Division One consisted of 16 clubs.
Clubs transferred from Division One North:
Bradley Rangers
Bridlington Town
Harrogate Railway Athletic
Harrogate Town
North Ferriby United
Rowntree Mackintosh
Clubs transferred from Division One Central:
Brigg Town
Hatfield Main
Ossett Albion
Pilkington Recreation
Woolley Miners Welfare
Clubs transferred from Division One South:
Borrowash Victoria
Dronfield United
Harworth Colliery Institute
Sheffield
Plus:
Mexborough Town Athletic, relegated from the Premier Division

League table

Division Two

At the end of the previous season divisions One North, One South and One Central was reorganised. The clubs were distributed between newly formed divisions One, Two and Three.
Division Two consisted of 16 clubs.
Clubs transferred from Division One North:
Garforth Miners, who also changed name to Garforth Town
Liversedge
Pickering Town
York Railway Institute
Clubs transferred from Division One Central:
Grimethorpe Miners Welfare
Maltby Miners Welfare
Ossett Town
BSC Parkgate
Thorne Colliery
Yorkshire Main
Clubs transferred from Division One South:
Arnold Kingswell
Frecheville Community
Hallam
Kiveton Park
Lincoln United
Staveley Works

League table

Division Three

At the end of the previous season divisions One North, One South and One Central was reorganised. The clubs were distributed between newly formed divisions One, Two and Three.
Division Three consisted of 14 clubs.
Clubs transferred from Division One North:
Collingham
Hall Road Rangers
Selby Town
Tadcaster Albion
Yorkshire Amateur
Clubs transferred from Division One Central:
Fryston Colliery Welfare
Stocksbridge Works
Wombwell Sporting Association
Worsbrough Bridge Miners Welfare
Clubs transferred from Division One South:
Graham Street Prims
Kimberley Town
Oakham United

Plus:
Eccleshill United, joined from the West Riding County Amateur Football League
Glasshoughton Welfare, joined from the West Yorkshire Association Football League

League table

References

1985-86
8